Jamie Collins may refer to:

Jamie Collins (American football) (born 1989), American football player
Jamie Collins (footballer, born 1978), English footballer
Jamie Collins (footballer, born 1984), English footballer
Jamie Collins (entrepreneur, born 2004), English entrepreneur

See also
James Collins (disambiguation)
Jamie Owens-Collins (born 1954), American Contemporary Christian music composer, singer and songwriter